St. John's Episcopal Church is an historic church in Tallahassee, Florida. It is located at 211 North Monroe Street. On August 10, 1978, it was added to the U.S. National Register of Historic Places.

The church body was first constituted in 1829. Services were held in the old Leon County court house on Monroe Street from 1829 to 1837. From 1837 to 1879 services were held in first church building at the same site. This building was consecrated in 1838, but eventually burned down in 1879. Services resumed in the court house, which also eventually burned down, and then in the capitol building, during the erection of present Gothic style, red brick church, erected in 1880 and dedicated in 1888. This building still stands, with art glass and memorial glass windows, pipe organ, bronze memorial tablet, altar service, bronze memorial tablet, altar service, carved lectern, prie-dieu, carillon. The church owns its rectory.

References

External links

 Leon County listings at National Register of Historic Places
 Florida's Office of Cultural and Historical Programs
 Leon County listings
 St. John's Episcopal Church

Churches completed in 1881
Towers completed in 1881
Episcopal church buildings in Florida
National Register of Historic Places in Tallahassee, Florida
Churches on the National Register of Historic Places in Florida
Churches in Tallahassee, Florida
Towers in Florida
Bell towers in the United States
History of Tallahassee, Florida
Churches in Leon County, Florida
19th-century Episcopal church buildings
1881 establishments in Florida